Azerbaijan State Theater of Young Spectators is a theatre located in the centre of Baku, Azerbaijan.

History of the theater
Azerbaijan State Theater of Young Spectators (ASTYS) was founded in 1928 as Baku Children’s Theater according to the Decision of the Commissariat of Public Enlightenment of Azerbaijan dated September 20, 1928. The initial group of actors and directors of the theatre included Aghadadash Gurbanov, Mammadagha Dadashov, Yusif Eminli, Mina Abdullayeva, Yusif Dadashov, Susanna Majidova, Javahir Isgandarova, Suleyman Alasgarov, Huseynagha Sadikhov, Karim Hasanov, Zafar Nematov, Maharram Hashimov, and Alimammad Atayev.

The Russian section of the theater started its activity on November 6, 1928 when a Russian troupe made a performance of the play “Five people” by N.Smirnov and S.Serbakov here for the first time. An Azerbaijani troupe, created on the basis of drama circle of pioneers affiliated with the Baku Club of Sailors became a member of this theatre, in 1930.

Azerbaijani section started on January 30, 1930 with “Against Red tie" by N.Ivanter.

In the first years of its existence, the theatre staged plays of Russian writers, which were constituted the repertoire of Young Spectators' Theatres of other cities of the USSR. In the 1930s, plays of Azerbaijani dramatists were included in the repertoire of the theatre: In the streets by Jafarov and Melik-Yeganov (1932), Nargiz (1936), Ayaz (1937), Gizil Gush (Golden bird) by Seyidzade (1938), and Mammad the Partisan by Isgandarov and Sabit Rahman (1939).

In 1936, the theater was named after Maxim Gorky.

Baku Children’s Theater was renamed based on the order of the Commissariat of Public Enlightenment of Azerbaijan on July 18, 1936 and has been called “Azerbaijan State Theater of Young Spectators” since then. The ASTYS was awarded with the Republic Lenin Komsomol Prize Laureate in 1978 and the Order of Honor in 1979.

Azerbaijan State Youth Theater and Baku Camera Theater were united to ASTYS according to the decisions of Cabinet of Ministers of Azerbaijan dated respectively on March 19 and September 30 in 2009.

Children's and Youth Theaters of Azerbaijan State Theater of Young Spectators was became the member of the International Association of Theater for Children and Young People (ASSITEJ) in May 2011 and national center of ASSITEJ was opened in Azerbaijan after a while.

The small stage of the Theater considered for mono and small volume plays was inaugurated in December 2013.

Festivals 
The ASTYS's troupe has been attending international theatre festivals since 2006:

Repertoire 
ASTYS’s repertoire includes plays of foreign (William Shakespeare, Martin McDonagh, Hans Christian Andersen, Aleksey Tolstoy) and domestic playwrights, such as Huseyn Javid, Jafar Jabbarli, Mirza Fatali Akhundzada, Ilyas Afandiyev, Suleyman Rustam, Abdurrahim bey Hagverdiyev, Abdulla Shaig, Nizami Ganjavi, Suleyman Sani Akhundov for both adults and schoolchildren.
Classical drama plays of Russian and foreign dramatists, plays of the Soviet writers and dramatists were also staged on the theater, such as The Government Inspector by Nikolai Gogol, Servant of Two Masters by William Shakespeare, and How the Steel Was Tempered by Nikolai Ostrovsky.

Projects 

 "The theater, education and morality";
 "We love the theater";
 "The first student card, the joy of the first acquaintance with the theater";
 "The personalities in the Heights";
 "Martyrs are immortal, homeland is indivisible";
 "I want to talk about theater".

Theatre personnel
Managing director of the ASTYS is Naida Ismayilzada. Bahram Osmanov is the chief director of the theatre.

Actors 
Yasin Garayev, Aghakhan Salmanli, Almaz Mustafayeva, Atabala Safarov, Naiba Allahverdiyeva, Gurban Ismayilov and others.

See also 

 Theatre in Azerbaijan
 Azerbaijan State Academic National Drama Theatre
 Azerbaijan State Academic Opera and Ballet Theater

References

External links 
 Official website of the Azerbaijan State Theater of Young Spectators

Theatres in Baku
Culture in Baku
Tourist attractions in Baku
1928 establishments in the Soviet Union
Buildings and structures in Baku